Barrier troops, blocking units, or anti-retreat forces are military units that are located in the rear or on the front line (behind the main forces) to maintain military discipline, prevent the flight of servicemen from the battlefield, capture spies, saboteurs and deserters, and return troops who flee from the battlefield or lag behind their units.

According to research by Jason Lyall, barrier troops are more likely to be used by the militaries of states that discriminate against the ethnic groups that comprise the state's military.

National Revolutionary Army

During the Battle of Nanking of the Second Sino-Japanese War, a battalion in the New 36th Division  of the National Revolutionary Army (NRA) was stationed at the Yijiang Gate with orders to guard the gate and "let no one through". On 12 December 1937, the NRA collapsed in the face of an offensive by the Imperial Japanese Army (IJA), and various units attempted to retreat without orders through the gate. The battalion responded by opening fire on the retreating NRA units, killing several people.

Red Army
In the Red Army of the RSFSR and the Soviet Union the concept of barrier troops first arose in August 1918 with the formation of the заградительные отряды  (zagraditelnye otriady), translated as "blocking troops" or "anti-retreat detachments". The barrier troops comprised personnel drawn from Cheka punitive detachments or from regular Red Army infantry regiments. 

The first use of the barrier troops by the Red Army occurred in the late summer and fall of 1918 in the Eastern front during the Russian Civil War, when People's Commissar of Military and Naval Affairs (War Commissar) Leon Trotsky of the Communist Bolshevik government authorized Mikhail Tukhachevsky, the commander of the 1st Army, to station blocking detachments behind unreliable Red Army infantry regiments in the 1st Red Army, with orders to shoot if front-line troops either deserted or retreated without permission.

In December 1918 Trotsky ordered that detachments of additional barrier troops be raised for attachment to each infantry formation in the Red Army. On December 18 he cabled: How do things stand with the blocking units? As far as I am aware they have not been included in our establishment and it appears they have no personnel. It is absolutely essential that we have at least an embryonic network of blocking units and that we work out a procedure for bringing them up to strength and deploying them. The barrier troops were also used to enforce Bolshevik control over food supplies in areas controlled by the Red Army, a role which soon earned them the hatred of the Russian civilian population.

The concept was re-introduced on a large scale during the Second World War. On June 27, 1941, in response to reports of unit disintegration in battle and desertion from the ranks in the Soviet Red Army, the 3rd Department (military counterintelligence of Soviet Army) of the People's Commissariat of Defense of the Soviet Union (NKO) issued a directive establishing mobile barrier forces composed of NKVD personnel to operate on roads, railways, forests, etc. for the purpose of catching "deserters and suspicious persons". 
With the continued deterioration of the military situation in the face of the German offensive of 1941, NKVD detachments acquired a new mission: to prevent the unauthorized withdrawal of Red Army forces from the battle line. The first troops of this kind were formed in the Bryansk Front on September 5, 1941.

On September 12, 1941 Joseph Stalin issued the Stavka Directive No. 1919 (Директива Ставки ВГК №001919) concerning the creation of barrier troops in rifle divisions of the Southwestern Front, to suppress panic retreats. Each Red Army division was to have an anti-retreat detachment equipped with transport totaling one company for each regiment. Their primary goal was to maintain strict military discipline and to prevent disintegration of the front line by any means. These barrier troops were usually formed from ordinary military units and placed under NKVD command.
 
In 1942, after Stavka Directive No. 227 (Директива Ставки ВГК №227) issued on 28 July 1942, set up penal battalions, anti-retreat detachments were used to prevent withdrawal or desertion by penal units as well.  Penal military unit personnel were always rearguarded by NKVD anti-retreat detachments, and not by regular Red Army infantry forces. As per Order No. 227, each Army should have had 3–5 barrier squads of up to 200 persons each.

A report to the Commissar General of State Security (NKVD chief) Lavrentiy Beria on October 10, 1941, noted that since the beginning of the war, NKVD anti-retreat troops had detained a total of 657,364 retreating, spies, traitors, instigators and deserting personnel, of which 25,878 were arrested (of which 10,201 were sentenced to death by court martial and the rest were returned to active duty).

At times, barrier troops were involved in battle operations along with regular soldiers, as noted by Aleksandr Vasilevsky in his directive N 157338 from October 1, 1942.

Order No. 227 also stipulated the capture or shooting of "cowards" and fleeing panicked troops at the rear of the blocking detachments, who in the first three months shot 1,000 penal troops and sent 24,993 more to penal battalions. By October 1942 the idea of regular blocking detachments was quietly dropped, and on 29 October 1944 Stalin officially ordered the disbanding of the units.

Practice and results of use

According to an official letter addressed in October 1941 to Lavrentiy Beria, in the period between the beginning of Operation Barbarossa to early December 1941, NKVD detachments had detained 657,364 servicemen who had fallen behind their lines and fled from the front. Of these detainees, 25,878 were arrested, and the remaining 632,486 were formed in units and sent back to the front. Among those arrested included accused 1505 spies, 308 saboteurs, 2621 traitors, 2643 "cowards and alarmists", 3987 distributors of "provocative rumors", and 4371 others. 10,201 of them were shot, meaning approximately 1.5% of those arrested were sentenced by military tribunals to death.

Richard Overy mentions the total number of those "sentenced to be shot during the war" was 158 thousand.

For a thorough check of the Red Army soldiers who were in captivity or surrounded by the enemy, by the decision of the State Defense Committee No. 1069ss of December 27, 1941, army collection and forwarding points were established in each army and special camps of the NKVD were organized. In 1941–1942, 27 special camps were created, but in connection with the inspection and shipment of verified servicemen to the front, they were gradually eliminated (by the beginning of 1943, only 7 special camps were operating). According to official data, in 1942, 177,081 former prisoners of war and surrounding men entered special camps. After checking by special departments of the NKVD, 150,521 people were transferred to the Red Army. 

On October 29, 1944, Order No. 0349 of the People's Commissar for Defense I. V. Stalin, the barrage detachments were disbanded due to a significant change in the situation at the front. Personnel joined the rifle units.

Syrian Army

It has been reported that in the initial stages of the Syrian civil war, regular soldiers sent to subdue protesters were surrounded by an outer cordon manned by forces known to be loyal to the regime, with orders to shoot those who refused their orders or attempted to flee.

Russian Ground Forces

According to Fedir Venislavsky, a member of the Ukrainian parliament's committee on national security and defence, the Russian Ground Forces used Chechen troops from the 141st Special Motorized Regiment during the 2022 invasion of Ukraine as barrier troops to shoot deserters who tried to leave combat zones. In October 2022, Ukrainian intelligence published a purported phone call where a Russian soldier described both his task of killing inmates recruited from prisons by the Wagner Group if they were retreating and how he would be killed by others if he himself retreated. In November, the British Ministry of Defence assessed that Russia was using blocking units.

In film
The 2001 film Enemy at the Gates shows Soviet Red Army commissars and barrier troops using a PM M1910 alongside their own small arms to gun down the few retreating survivors of a failed charge on a German position during the Battle of Stalingrad. The 2011 South Korean film My Way also depicts Soviet blocking troops shooting retreating soldiers during a charge. Both cases are part of fiction in the films.

References

Further reading
Lai, Benjamin, Shanghai and Nanjing 1937: Massacre on the Yangtze, Osprey Publishing (2017), 
Karpov, Vladimir, Russia at War: 1941–45, trans. Lydia Kmetyuk (New York: The Vendome Press (1987)
Overy, R. J., The Dictators: Hitler's Germany and Stalin's Russia, W. W. Norton & Company (2004), 
Органы государственной безопасности СССР в Великой Отечественной войне. Сборник документов,
Том 1. Книга 1. Накануне, Издательство "Книга и бизнес", (1995) 
Том 1. Книга 2. Накануне, Издательство "Книга и бизнес", (1995) 
Том 2. Книга 1. Начало, Издательство "Русь" (2000)  
Том 2. Книга 2. Начало, Издательство "Русь" (2000)   
Том 3. Книга 1. Крушение "Блицкрига", Издательство: Русь, 2003, 
Том 3. Книга 2. От обороны к наступлению, Издательство: Русь, 2003,

External links
 On the concept of Soviet Barrier Troops, as portrayed in popular media and in reality - Text (access date 2022-07-24)
 On the concept of Soviet Barrier Troops, as portrayed in popular media and in reality - Notes and Works Cited (access date 2022-07-24)

NKVD
Military of the Soviet Union